Louis Carrion (Ludovicus Carrio) (1547 – 23 June 1595) was a Flemish humanist and classical scholar. He is known for his precocious edition of the Argonautica of Gaius Valerius Flaccus, from 1565/6. This was printed from a manuscript now referred to as the Codex Carrionis, or C; which was later lost. Carrion's scholarship has regularly been challenged, ever since.

He is known too for commentary on Sallust (1574), and work on Tertullian, the astrologer Censorinus (1583), and Aulus Gellius (1585, with Henry Estienne). He also published letters of Ogier de Busbecq.

Works
 In Valerii Flacci Setini Balbi Argonauticon libros octo castigationes (Antwerp, Plantinus, 1566)
 Antiquarum lectionum commentarii III. In quibus varia scriptorum veterum loca supplentur, corriguntur et illustrantur

References
Ruth Taylor, The Authority of the Codex Carrionis in the MS-Tradition of Valerius Flaccus, Classical Quarterly, New Series, Vol. 39, No. 2 (1989), pp. 451–471

Notes

1547 births
1595 deaths
Flemish classical scholars
Flemish academics
Flemish Renaissance humanists
French male non-fiction writers